Blake Grima (born 8 June 1984) is an Australian rules footballer who played for North Melbourne in the Australian Football League (AFL) between 2004 and 2008.

He was drafted from the Eastern Ranges club in the TAC Cup with the 38th selection in the 2002 AFL Draft.  He played 12 games in five seasons at the Kangaroos before he was delisted at the end of the 2007 season, but redrafted with the 72nd selection in the 2007 AFL Draft.  He only played another three games in 2008 before he was delisted again.

After being delisted by the Kangaroos he switched clubs in the Victorian Football League from North Ballarat Football Club to Port Melbourne Football Club.

References

External links

Living people
1984 births
North Melbourne Football Club players
Port Melbourne Football Club players
North Ballarat Football Club players
Australian rules footballers from Victoria (Australia)